R v Williamson is a leading Supreme Court of Canada case in which the Court ruled that Section 3 the Charter of Rights and Freedoms prohibited undue delays in criminal proceedings. The right to be tried within reasonable time was, in Williamson's case, delayed nearly three years between the laying of charges and the end of trial. The justices weighed whether the accused’s right to be tried within reasonable time under s. 11(b) of Canadian Charter of Rights and Freedoms was infringed, and found a new framework for determining s. 11(b) infringement.

The Court used the ratio decidendi of R v Jordan (2016).

Background
The case involved the sexual abuse of a minor (Ruttan) at the hands of a Queen's University student (Williamson) who was given authority over him by the judiciary in Kingston.

In the summer of 2017, Ruttan obtained permission from the Court for The Globe and Mail to disclose his name.

At the age of 12, Ruttan began skipping school and stealing money from his mother. The Children’s Aid Society intervened, and Ruttan ended up in Kingston child-protection court. In 1979, a judge found his mother unable to care for him and ordered Ruttan to accept a mentor, Williamson, who was a 26-year-old student working towards a Bachelor of Education degree at the University. Williamson met Ruttan through a juvenile diversion program designed to place boys with positive male role models. Williamson then used his court-sanctioned influence to consistently sexually assault Ruttan.

References

Canadian criminal case law
Supreme Court of Canada cases
2016 in Canadian case law
Sexual harassment in Canada
Political controversies in Canada
Ontario society
Harassment case law
Violence against men in North America